Eugen Wüster (10 October 1898 – 29 March 1977) was an industrialist and terminologist.

Career 
Wüster became enthusiastic about Esperanto when he was 15, soon coming to the fore as an Esperanto translator 
and as the author of various monographs and numerous articles, particularly on questions of Esperanto terminology 
and lexicography. He trained in electrical engineering and later took over his father's factory.

From mid-1918 to 1920, as a 20- to 22-year-old student, he compiled the core of the legendary encyclopedic Esperanto-German dictionary, which is still unmatched to this day for its detailed and faithful presentation of the early vocabulary of Esperanto and the usage of its founder, L.L. Zamenhof. The experience Wüster acquired in compiling this dictionary formed the basis for his Stuttgart thesis, which is regarded as a seminal work on Terminology Science (2nd edition, Bonn 1966).

Due to his research on international technical communication, the Technical Committee for Terminology Standardization of the International Organization for Standardization (ISO/TC 37) was established in 1936.

Wüster forged the international principles of terminology standardization and contributed significantly to the foundations of the modern information society. The influence of Wüster's terminology ideas has been enormous especially in the medical field, where it has also given rise to a critical reaction.

He taught at the University of Vienna. The Eugen-Wüster Archives at the University of Vienna as well as at the Esperanto Museum and Department of Planned Languages of the Austrian National Library are based on material that he bequeathed.

The Eugene Wüster Prize for outstanding achievements in the field of terminological research has been established under the sponsorship of the Vienna University and the City of Vienna.

Terminology 

Wüster collaborated in the compilation and publishing of the first edition of the International Electrotechnical Vocabulary, London 1938. The latest version of this vocabulary is available online.

He also worked on problems of bibliography, on reform of German orthography, on the Universal Decimal Classification system, on problems in informatics. He was an expert concerning saws, edited a model standard dictionary using the example of Machine tools, the latest version of which is available online. 
In 1971 Wüster initiated the founding of Infoterm, which he pro-actively supported until his death.
He left many unpublished manuscripts on various subjects.

Publications (selection) 
 Internationale Sprachnormung in der Technik, besonders in der Elektrotechnik (International Language standardization in technology, particularly in electrical engineering.'). (Die nationale Sprachnormung und ihre Verallgemeinerung) (The national language standardization and generalization). Berlin: VDJ 1931. 2nd edition. Bonn: Bouvier 1966
 Die Herstellung der Sägeblätter für Holz. Eine Betriebsführung für Sägewerker und andere Sägenfachleute (The production of saw blades for wood. An operational guide for saw mills and other cutting specialists). Springer, Wien 1952
 Bibliography of monolingual scientific and technical glossaries, 2nd edition, Unesco, Paris 1955, 1959
 Einführung in die allgemeine Terminologielehre und terminologische Lexikographie (the general introduction to terminology and terminological lexicography lesson). 3rd Edition, Romanistischer Verlag, Bonn 1991, 
 International bibliography of standardized vocabularies.  Bibliographie internationale de vocabulaires normalisés. (International Bibliography of the standard dictionaries.) Initiated by Eugene Wüster. Prepared by Helmut Felber [et al.]. 2nd ed / Wüster, Eugen / Saur, München 1979

Translations
  Introduction to the General Theory of Terminology and Terminological Lexicography. Springer, Wien 1979
  Introduction à la théorie générale de la terminologie et à la lexicographie terminologique. Girsterm, Université Laval, Quebec 1979
  Introducción a la teoría general de la terminología y a la lexicografía terminológica. Institut Universitari de Lingüística Aplicada (IULA), Universität Pompeu Fabra, Barcelona 1998,  (2nd edition 2003)

References

External links
 

1898 births
1977 deaths
Austrian scientists
Linguists from Austria
Austrian Esperantists
Terminologists
20th-century linguists
20th-century lexicographers